Have a Heart may refer to:

Film and TV
Have a Heart (1928 film) starring Jimmy Aubrey
 Have a Heart (film), a 1934 drama film directed by David Butler
 Have a Heart (TV series), a 1955 game show

Music
"Just Have a Heart", a song by Celine Dion from the 1990 album Unison, also recorded with the title "Have a Heart"
"Have a Heart", song by Dean Martin from the 1965 album Dean Martin Hits Again
"Have a Heart", a song by Bonnie Raitt from the 1989 album Nick of Time
"Have a Heart", a song by Prince from the 2002 album One Nite Alone...

See also
Have a Heart Compassion Care, a cannabis company in the United States